Mohammad Abu Yusuf (born 11 September 1957) is a Bangladeshi football coach and former player, who last served as the head coach of Bangladesh Championship League club NoFeL SC.

Early life
Yusuf was born on 11 September 1957, in Bakshibazar, Dhaka. His father was a religious speaker at the Bakshibazar Mosque while his mother was a stay at home parent. Yusuf was the eldest among six brothers and seven sisters, and spent much of his childhood in Kolkata, where he would become an avid fan of Kolkata Mohammedan. Back in East Pakistan, Yusuf was inspired by Dhaka League players, such as Golam Sarwar Tipu and Abdul Ghafoor.

During the Bangladesh Liberation War in 1971, Yusuf supported his family financially by driving rickshaw's while still studying in eight grade at the Nabakumar Institution. He started playing football through an interschool football tournament, that took place in 1972. He played as a guest footballer for the senior teams of Bakshibazar, Chawk Bazar, Panchabati and Churihatta.

Club career
In 1972, Mahuttuli Sporting footballer Khorshed took Yusuf to the trials for Star of Bangladesh Club who played in the Dhaka Third Division League. He failed to make the cut and was later also rejected by Mahuttuli Sporting for being too small. Eventually, the assistant coach of Fire Service SC, Bazlur Rahman, gave Yusuf the opportunity to play for Kamal Sporting in the Dhaka Second Division League. He played two games in the unfinished league. In 1973, Yusuf got a job at the Dhakeswari Cotton Mill, and with them he played a few local tournaments on a monthly salary. In 1974, a Russian coach held trials for the Bangladesh U19 team in Comilla, and Yusuf got into the final squad for the 1975 AFC Youth Championship in Kuwait.

In 1974, he made his Dhaka League debut with Fire Service SC. The following year he joined Rahmatganj MFS, where he spent 6 consecutive years and even guided the club to their highest league position in 1977, when they finished runners-up to Abahani Krira Chakra. In 1980, he moved to Mohammedan SC, and became league champion in both 1980 and 1982. He was also part of the team that won the Ashis-Jabbar Shield Tournament in India, as the Black and Whites became the first Bangladeshi club to win a trophy on foreign soil. In 1981, Yusuf was operated for his injured knee in the middle of the season, which lead to his falling out with the Mohammedan officials.

In 1983, Yusuf joined Abahani Krira Chakra, with them he won a hat-trick of league titles from 1983 till 1985. He was also appointed club captain in 1986, and guided them to their third Federation Cup title. He also found success in continental level, as Abahani were runners-up in the Central Asian Zone of the 1985–86 Asian Club Championship, and champions of India's Charms Cup and Sait Nagjee Trophy, during the latter Yusuf was captain. After almost a decade at Abahani, he joined Victoria SC in 1991, and was later the coach cum player of Jurain Sporting in the Second Division League. Eventually he retired in 1994, as an Abahani player.

International career
After playing for the Bangladesh U19 at the AFC Youth Championship, Yusuf made his senior team debut in 1975, at Merdeka Cup. He labelled his first tournament with the national team as "tragic" due to the 15 August 1975 Bangladeshi coup d'état. On the same day, a below par Bangladesh team were compelled to play their last group game against South Korea, which they lost 4–0. He was recalled to the team for the 1978 Asian Games and later lost his place to Shahiduddin Ahmed Selim during the second phase of the 1980 AFC Asian Cup qualifiers, in Dhaka.

On 14 September 1979, he scored his only international goal for Bangladesh, in a 3–1 victory over Sri Lanka, at the 1979 Korea President's Cup. Yusuf started all four games at the 1980 AFC Asian Cup, and captained the national team the following year at the first President's Gold Cup. Although he was called up to the preliminary squad for the 1982 Asian Games, he was excluded from German coach Gerd Schmidt's final selection. It was suspected that Yusuf, was scapegaoted for Bangladesh's poor performances at the Quaid-e-Azam International Cup and President's Gold Cup tournaments held earlier that year.

At the 1985 South Asian Games final against India, Yusuf was one of the players who failed to covert his penalty as Bangladesh lost 1–4 in the tie-breaker. In both 1986 and 1987 he played at the President's Gold Cup with the Bangladesh Red team.

Managerial career
After gaining experience while coaching Jurain Sporting, Yusuf was appointed as the assistant coach of Samir Shaker at Abahani. In 1995, he was appointed as the head coach of Mohammedan SC. Yusuf, guided Mohammedan to the DMFA Cup and Federation Cup, however, was replaced by Nigerian coach Kadiri Ikhana before the league season began. Nonetheless, after losing eight points in the first four league games, Yusuf was reappointed as head coach. Mohammedan finished runners-up to Muktijoddha SKC in the championship playoff, after their star players Motiur Rahman Munna and Kaiser Hamid suffered season ending injuries.

In 1996 and 1999, under his coaching, Victoria SC were promoted from the First Division League to the Premier Division League. Yusuf took charge of Abahani the following year, and won the Federation Cup for the second time in his managerial career. In 1998, he managed the Bangladesh national team during two friendly matches which ended in draws against middle-eastern giants Qatar and their U23 team. He also guided Chittagong Abahani to their maiden semi-final appearance at the 2001–02 National Football Championship. Yusuf coached Bangladesh U20 at the 2004 AFC Youth Championship qualifiers, as his team missed out on qualification on goal difference.

On 3 October 2004, Yusuf signed a one-year contract with Sheikh Russel KC and guided them to fifth position in the league, playing in an unorthodox 5-3-2 formation. In 2007, he joined Muktijoddha SKC, which became his first Bangladesh Premier League team. However, his stay at there was cut short as Yusuf had a row with senior players, who were ignored by the coach due to lack of fitness. Yusuf later coached Bangladesh U23 at the 2008 Summer Olympics qualifiers, where his team lost 1–3 on aggregate to Hong Kong U23.

Yusuf also focused on women's football, and trained the Bangladesh Football Federation President's Eleven in 2004, and was also the coach of the unofficial Bangladesh Women's Team who played a friendly against the travelling Orissa State football team from India, in 2007. In 2008, Yusuf  decided to return to Victoria SC for his fourth stint with the club, however, Victoria could not earn promotion from the Dhaka Senior Division Football League, which was then the second-tier (previously first-tier and currently the third-tier).

On 4 March 2008, Yusuf was made Bangladesh national team coach for the 2008 AFC Challenge Cup qualifiers and the 2008 SAFF Championship. Yusuf selected an inexperienced squad for the AFC Challenge Cup qualifiers, and during their opening match draw against Afghanistan, he handed debuts to three players – Mamunul Islam, Arup Kumar Baidya, Kazi Mofazzal Hossain (sent off during the game) and Maroof Ahmed. Nonetheless, the next game resulted in a (1–2) defeat to Kyrgyzstan which ended Bangladesh's qualification hopes. Later on that year at the SAFF Championship, Bangladesh produced one of their worst performances at the competition, and failed to advance past the group-stage with 2 draws and 1 loss. Yusuf resigned after the tournament, stating it was due to interference from the Bangladesh Football Federation (BFF).

Yusuf spent the next few years managing minnows Farashganj SC and Feni SC in the Bangladesh Premier League, and he enjoyed relative success by helping them avoid relegation. On 16 February 2012, Yusuf joined Sheikh Jamal DC, and lead the club to a runners-up position in the 2012–13 Bangladesh Premier League and 2012 Federation Cup. Yusuf also finished runner-up at the 2015 Federation Cup with Muktijoddha SKC.

Yusuf was reappointed as Farashganj SC head coach in April 2017. However, midway thorugh the 2017–18 Bangladesh Premier League, Yusuf was sacked by Farashganj, and the club eventually went onto be relegated from the top-tier. In June 2021, Yusuf took charge of Wari Club, during the second phase of the 2020–21 Bangladesh Championship League. He remained in the second-tier, managing NoFeL SC during the 2022–23 Bangladesh Championship League, before facing the sack halfway thorugh the league season, in January 2023.

Honours

Player
Mohammedan SC
Dhaka League = 1980, 1982
Federation Cup = 1980, 1981, 1982
Ashis-Jabbar Shield Tournament (India) = 1982

Abahani Limited Dhaka
Dhaka League = 1983, 1984, 1985, 1989–90, 1994
Federation Cup = 1985, 1986, 1988
Sait Nagjee Trophy (India) = 1989
Independence Cup = 1990
BTC Club Cup = 1991
Charms Cup (India) = 1994

Manager
Mohammedan SC
DMFA Cup = 1995
Federation Cup = 1995

Abahani Limited Dhaka
Federation Cup = 1997

Victoria SC
Dhaka First Division League = 1996, 1999

Awards and accolades
2002− Sports Writers Association's Coach of the Year.
2017 − National Sports Award.

References

External links
 

Bangladeshi footballers
Bangladesh international footballers
Living people
1957 births
Footballers from Dhaka
Association football defenders
Rahmatganj MFS players
Abahani Limited (Dhaka) players
Mohammedan SC (Dhaka) players
Footballers at the 1978 Asian Games
1980 AFC Asian Cup players
Asian Games competitors for Bangladesh
Bangladeshi football managers
Bangladesh national football team managers
Abahani Limited Dhaka managers
Bangladeshi football coaches
South Asian Games medalists in football
South Asian Games silver medalists for Bangladesh
Recipients of the Bangladesh National Sports Award